This is a list of polyamorous characters in fiction, including those in animation and graphic art works. It is organized alphabetically by last name of the main character involved in the polyamorous relationship, or first name if there is no last name known.

For more information about fictional characters in the related LGBTQ community, see the lists of trans, lesbian, gay, bisexual, non-binary, pansexual, asexual, and intersex characters.



Animation and anime

Comics

Films

Literature

Live-action television

Web series

See also

 List of polyamorists
 Epicenity
 LGBT themes in comics
 List of animated series with LGBTQ characters
 List of LGBT-themed speculative fiction
 List of LGBT characters in soap operas
 List of LGBT-related films
 Lists of LGBT figures in fiction and myth

Notes

References

Polyamorous